Thomas Beekman (born 23 January 2000) is a Dutch professional footballer who plays as a midfielder for Eerste Divisie club TOP Oss.

Career

Early years
Born in Arnhem, Beekman started his career in the youth department of SML Arnhem, before moving to the Vitesse academy at age 11. He made his debut for the reserve team on 3 December 2016 in the Tweede Divisie match against Excelsior Maassluis, replacing Levi van der Spek in the 63rd minute. In 2019, he moved to the youth department of NEC – the fierce rivals of Vitesse.

NEC
In the summer of 2020, Beekman was promoted to the first team of NEC by manager Rogier Meijer and was given jersey number 12. On 11 September, he made his debut for NEC in the Eerste Divisie in the 2–1 win against Jong Ajax. Six minutes before the final he came on for Elayis Tavşan. On 20 October, he scored his first goal for the club. As a substitute, he saved a point in the 1–1 away match against Jong PSV. On 23 May 2021, Beekman won promotion to the Eredivisie with NEC, by beating NAC Breda 1–2 in the final of the play-offs.

Loan to Helmond Sport
On 14 January 2022, Beekman joined Helmond Sport on loan until the end of the season.

TOP Oss
On 25 June 2022, Beekman joined TOP Oss on a one-year deal.

Career statistics

Club

References

External links
 
 

2000 births
Living people
Dutch footballers
Association football midfielders
Footballers from Arnhem
SBV Vitesse players
NEC Nijmegen players
Helmond Sport players
TOP Oss players
Tweede Divisie players
Eerste Divisie players
Eredivisie players